Senator Carr may refer to:

David G. Carr (1809–1889), Virginia State Senate
Francis Carr (District of Maine politician) (1751–1821), Maine State Senate
Peter P. Carr (1890–1966), Wisconsin State Senate
Robert S. Carr (1845–1925), West Virginia State Senate
Samuel Carr (politician) (1771–1855), Virginia State Senate